Spell-Mageddon was an American spelling bee game show on ABC Family and was hosted by Alfonso Ribeiro. It premiered on July 24, 2013. The series finale aired on September 11, 2013.

Format
The show's format combined a spelling bee with obstacle courses similar to Wipeout.

Episodes

Reception
Mary McNamara of The Los Angeles Times said the show doesn't look fun at all and also said the distractions endured by the contestants are "more annoying than compelling." Emily Ashby Common Sense Media gave the show 3 out of 5 stars.

References

External links
 

2010s American game shows
2013 American television series debuts
2013 American television series endings
ABC Family original programming